Ahmed bin Khalifa Al Suwaidi (born 15 December 1937 in Abu Dhabi) is an Emirati politician who was the first Minister of Foreign Affairs of the United Arab Emirates from 1971 to 1980, and the Personal Representative of the President of the United Arab Emirates. He played a significant role in the unification of the United Arab Emirates and was the first to read the statement of the founding of the United Arab Emirates on December 2, 1971.

Awards
 Abu Dhabi Awards, 2006

References 

1937 births
Living people
Foreign ministers of the United Arab Emirates
Emirati politicians